This is a list of compositions by Anton Webern, the Austrian composer and conductor.

Works with opus numbers 

The works with opus numbers are the ones that Webern saw fit to have published in his own lifetime, plus a few late works published after his death. They constitute the main body of his work, although several pieces of juvenilia and a few mature pieces that do not have opus numbers are occasionally performed today.
 Op. 1, Passacaglia for orchestra (1908)
 Op. 2, Entflieht auf leichten Kähnen for a cappella choir, on a poem by Stefan George (1908)
 Op. 3, Fünf Lieder (Five Songs) for voice and piano, on Der Siebente Ring by Stefan George (1907–08)
 Op. 4, Fünf Lieder for voice and piano, poems by Stefan George (1908–09)
 Op. 5, Five Movements for string quartet (1909); version for string orchestra (1929)
 Op. 6, Six Pieces for large orchestra (1909–10, revised 1928)
 Op. 7, Four Pieces for violin and piano (1910)
 Op. 8, Zwei Lieder (Two Songs) for voice and 8 instruments, on poems by Rainer Maria Rilke (1910)
 Op. 9, Six Bagatelles for string quartet (1913)
 Op. 10, Five Pieces for orchestra (1911–13)
 Op. 11, Three Little Pieces for cello and piano (1914)
 Op. 12, Vier Lieder (Four Songs) for voice and piano (1915–17)
 Op. 13, Vier Lieder for voice and orchestra (1914–18)
 Op. 14, Sechs Lieder (Six Songs) for voice, clarinet, bass clarinet, violin and cello on poems by Georg Trakl (1917–21)
 Op. 15, Five Sacred Songs for voice and small ensemble (1917–22)
 Op. 16, Five Canons for high soprano, clarinet and bass clarinet (1923–24)
 Op. 17, Three Traditional Rhymes for voice, violin (doubling viola), clarinet and bass clarinet (1924–25)
 Op. 18, Drei Lieder (Three Songs) for voice, E-flat clarinet and guitar (1925)
 Op. 19, Zwei Lieder, for mixed choir, celesta, guitar, violin, clarinet and bass clarinet, on poems by Johann Wolfgang Goethe (1926)
 Op. 20, String Trio (1927)
 Op. 21, Symphony (1928)
 Op. 22, Quartet for violin, clarinet, tenor saxophone and piano (1930)
 Op. 23, Drei Lieder for voice and piano, on Hildegard Jone's Viae inviae (1934)
 Op. 24, Concerto for Nine Instruments (1934)
 Op. 25, Drei Lieder for voice and piano, on poems by Hildegard Jone (1934–35)
 Op. 26, Das Augenlicht for mixed choir and orchestra, on a poem by Hildegard Jone (1935)
 Op. 27, Variations for piano (1936)
 Op. 28, String Quartet (1937–38)
 Op. 29, Cantata No. 1 for soprano, mixed choir and orchestra, on a poem by Hildegard Jone (1938–39)
 Op. 30, Variations for orchestra (1940)
 Op. 31, Cantata No. 2 for soprano, bass, choir and orchestra, on a poem by Hildegard Jone (1941–43)

Works without opus numbers 
 Two Pieces for cello and piano (1899)
 Three Poems for voice and piano (1899–1902)
 "Vorfruhling"
 "Nacthgebet der Braut"
 "Fromm"
 Eight Early Songs for voice and piano (1901–04)
 "Tief von fern"
 "Aufblick"
 "Blumengruss"
 "Bild der Liebe"
 "Sommerabend"
 "Heiter"
 "Der Tod"
 "Heimgang in der Frühe"
 Three Songs after Ferdinand Avenarius (1903–04)
 "Gefunden"
 "Gebet"
 "Freunde"
 Im Sommerwind, idyll for large orchestra after a poem by Bruno Wille (1904)
 Langsamer Satz (slow movement) for string quartet (1905)
 String Quartet (August 1905)
 Piece for piano (1906)
 Rondo for piano (1906)
 Rondo for string quartet (1906)
 Five Songs after Richard Dehmel (1906–08)
 Piano Quintet (1907)
 Four Songs after Stefan George (1908–09)
 Five Pieces for orchestra (1913) - related to op. 10, first pub. 1971, edited by Friedrich Cerha
 Bewegt
 (Sostenuto)
 bewegte Viertel
 Viertel
 (Alla Breve)
 Three Pieces for String Quartet and Mezzosoprano (1913)
 Bewegt
 "Schmerz immer Blick nach oben"
 zu langsam
 Three Songs for voice and orchestra (1913–14)
 "Leise Düfte"
 "Kunfttag III. 'Nun wird es wieder Lenz'"
 "O sanftes Glühn der Berge"
 Cello Sonata (1914)
 Piece for children for piano (1924)
 Piece for piano, in the tempo of a minuet (1925)
 Piece for string trio (1925)

Arrangements
 "Thränenregen", "Ihr Bild", Romance [from Rosamunde], "Der Wegweiser", and "Du bist die Ruh’", by Franz Schubert, arranged for voice and orchestra (1903)
 Schatzwalzer by Johann Strauss II for string quartet, harmonium, and piano (1921)
 Chamber Symphony No. 1, op. 9, by Arnold Schoenberg, arranged for flute (or violin), clarinet (or viola), piano, violin, and cello (1922–23)
 Arbeiterchor by Franz Liszt, arranged for bass solo, chorus, and orchestra (1924)
 Deutsche Tänze (German Dances) by Schubert (1824, drawn from D.820), orchestrated by Webern (1931)
 Fuga (Ricercata) a 6 voci [Fugue No. 2] from Johann Sebastian Bach's "Musical Offering", orchestrated (1934–35)

By Genre

Piano 

 Piece for piano (1906)
 Rondo for piano (1906)
 Piece for children for piano (1924)
 Piece for piano, in the tempo of a minuet (1925)
 Op. 27, Variations for piano (1936)

Chamber music

String Quartet 

 Langsamer Satz (slow movement) for string quartet (1905)
 String Quartet (August 1905)
 Rondo for string quartet (1906)
 Op. 5, Five Movements for string quartet (1909); version for string orchestra (1929)
 Op. 9, Six Bagatelles for string quartet (1913)
 Op. 28, String Quartet (1937–38)

String Trio 

 Piece for string trio (1925)
 Op. 20, String Trio (1927)

Cello and Piano 

 Two Pieces for cello and piano (1899)
 Op. 11, Three Little Pieces for cello and piano (1914)
 Cello Sonata (1914)

Other Chamber Music 

 Piano Quintet (1907)
 Op. 7, Four Pieces for violin and piano (1910)
 Op. 22, Quartet for violin, clarinet, tenor saxophone and piano (1930)
 Op. 24, Concerto for Nine Instruments (1934)

Vocal

Voice and Piano 

 Three Poems for voice and piano (1899–1902) 
 Eight Early Songs for voice and piano (1901–04) 
 Three Songs after Ferdinand Avenarius (1903–04) 
 Five Songs after Richard Dehmel (1906–08)
 Op. 3, Fünf Lieder (Five Songs) for voice and piano, on Der Siebente Ring by Stefan George (1907–08)
 Four Songs after Stefan George (1908–09)
 Op. 4, Fünf Lieder for voice and piano, poems by Stefan George (1908–09)
 Op. 12, Vier Lieder (Four Songs) for voice and piano (1915–17)
 Op. 23, Drei Lieder for voice and piano, on Hildegard Jone's Viae inviae (1934)
 Op. 25, Drei Lieder for voice and piano, on poems by Hildegard Jone (1934–35)

Voice and Chamber Ensemble 

 Op. 8, Zwei Lieder (Two Songs) for voice and 8 instruments, on poems by Rainer Maria Rilke (1910)
 Three Pieces for String Quartet and Mezzosoprano (1913)
 Op. 14, Sechs Lieder (Six Songs) for voice, clarinet, bass clarinet, violin and cello on poems by Georg Trakl (1917–21)
 Op. 15, Five Sacred Songs for voice and small ensemble (1917–22)
 Op. 16, Five Canons for high soprano, clarinet and bass clarinet (1923–24)
 Op. 17, Three Traditional Rhymes for voice, violin (doubling viola), clarinet and bass clarinet (1924–25)
 Op. 18, Drei Lieder (Three Songs) for voice, E-flat clarinet and guitar (1925)

Voice and Orchestra 

 Three Songs for voice and orchestra (1913–14)
 Op. 13, Vier Lieder for voice and orchestra (1914–18)

Choral 

 Op. 2, Entflieht auf leichten Kähnen for a cappella choir, on a poem by Stefan George (1908)
 Op. 19, Zwei Lieder, for mixed choir, celesta, guitar, violin, clarinet and bass clarinet, on poems by Johann Wolfgang Goethe (1926)
 Op. 26, Das Augenlicht for mixed choir and orchestra, on a poem by Hildegard Jone (1935)
 Op. 29, Cantata No. 1 for soprano, mixed choir and orchestra, on a poem by Hildegard Jone (1938–39)
 Op. 31, Cantata No. 2 for soprano, bass, choir and orchestra, on a poem by Hildegard Jone (1941–43)

Orchestra 

 Im Sommerwind, idyll for large orchestra after a poem by Bruno Wille (1904)
 Op. 1, Passacaglia for orchestra (1908)
 Op. 6, Six Pieces for large orchestra (1909–10, revised 1928)
 Op. 10, Five Pieces for orchestra (1911–13)
 Five Pieces for orchestra (1913) - related to op. 10, first pub. 1971, edited by Friedrich Cerha
 Op. 21, Symphony (1928)
 Op. 30, Variations for orchestra (1940)

See also
List of compositions by Alban Berg

Webern, Anton